Angloise is the name of a piece of classical music from "Notebook for Wolfgang" written for Wolfgang Amadeus Mozart by his father Leopold Mozart.  The composition was written for piano in D minor.

Compositions by Leopold Mozart
Compositions for solo piano
Compositions in D minor